Trilogy is a box set by the German musical project Enigma. This set includes the first three studio albums by Enigma, MCMXC a.D., The Cross of Changes, and Le Roi est mort, vive le Roi!, which comprises their artistic output from 1990–1996.

Box set contents
MCMXC a.D. (1990)
The Cross of Changes (1993)
Le Roi est mort, vive le Roi! (1996)

Certifications

References

1998 compilation albums
Enigma (German band) albums
Virgin Records compilation albums